Adventures in Wonderland is a 1992–1995 American live-action/puppet musical television series based on the novels Alice's Adventures in Wonderland (1865) and Through the Looking-Glass (1871) by Lewis Carroll as well as the 1951 animated film. In the series, Alice (played by Elisabeth Harnois), is portrayed as a girl who can come and go from Wonderland simply by walking through her mirror (a reference to Through the Looking-Glass).

Production
The series originally ran from March 23, 1992 to 1995 (with reruns continuing until at least 1998) on The Disney Channel and on stations across the country. Adventures in Wonderland was originally taped at Disney-MGM Studios at the Walt Disney World Resort in Bay Lake, Florida, with two sound stages used exclusively for the show, for its first 40 episodes. Afterward, shooting was moved to Los Angeles, CA.

The Cheshire Cat and Dormouse puppets were created by Chiodo Bros. Inc.

Plot
Each episode begins with Alice facing different problems and consulting with her cat Dinah. In order to find the answer she needs to get through a situation, she goes through her mirror that takes her to Wonderland where she partakes in strange adventures with its inhabitants that revolve around the situation that she is dealing with at home. Every episode features singing and dancing.

Characters

Main
Alice (portrayed by Elisabeth Harnois) is the show's protagonist. Alice is an average preteen, often facing problems in school, with her younger brother Brian, older sister Kathy, friends Kim and Jennifer, or some other issue. She often confides in her cat Dinah about her day. Alice has a special gift in that she is able to pass into Wonderland by walking through her mirror (see Through the Looking-Glass). Whenever she arrives, she helps her friends solve their problems, which in turn offers a solution to hers back in her world.
The Red Queen (portrayed by Armelia McQueen) is the ruler of Wonderland. The Red Queen, or Queen of Hearts, is Wonderland's sole monarch (she is a combination of The Queen of Hearts from Carroll's original book and the Red Queen from Through the Looking-Glass). She is strict but fair, often citing her mother and grandmother's example in her ruling. Unfortunately, the Queen is occasionally a source for trouble, usually due to her selfish attitude. As queen, she expects to get whatever she wants right away, and often pouts when things go wrong – often to the point where she says "Oh, harumph!". She usually ends up eating crow by the end of the episode, but sometimes, she offers solutions to problems other Wonderland residents face. Deep down, she cares greatly for her subjects (especially the White Rabbit), throwing them parties and celebrating their accomplishments. Unlike other adaptations of both the Queen of Hearts, and Red Queen, she is more of a protagonist, instead of an antagonist.
The White Rabbit (portrayed by Patrick Richwood) is the queen's chief lackey. The White Rabbit is the Queen's personal chef, servant, butler, event planner, shopping assistant, and every other job that she can think of at the time. He wears inline skates to get around, and occasionally loses control-with humorous results. He is also exceptionally timid, unable to stand up to the Queen when he is being treated unjustly. Rabbit is good friends with the other citizens of Wonderland, and he is often a notable accomplice in their schemes, given his proximity to Her Majesty. Though he occasionally complains, the White Rabbit is actually the Queen's closest confidant, and he often sympathizes with her.
The Mad Hatter (portrayed by John Robert Hoffman) lives in a house shaped like a hat and is usually seen at his perpetually set tea table. He tends to be rather careless with his dishes and cups. The Mad Hatter is Wonderland's chief inventor, often devising crazy machines and potions to get himself and the gang out of trouble. However, the devices tend to get them into further trouble. He also has an affinity for disguises, such as fake beards and nose/eyeglasses. His catch phrase is, "How true that is."
The March Hare (portrayed by Reece Holland) can be intelligent at times, and he often assists his best friend the Mad Hatter in inventing and scheming. The Hare tends to lack common sense and is easily duped by others. The March Hare also usually serves the role of conscience among his friends; when a poor choice of judgment is reached, he is usually the one who questions the decision the most. 
Tweedle Dum and Tweedle Dee (portrayed by Robert Barry Fleming and Harry Waters Jr.) are a pair of rapping Fraternal twins. The Tweedles wear bright, colorful clothing. As brothers, they share a strong sibling rivalry, often competing with each other about nearly everything. They are the most athletic residents of Wonderland, often playing sports and organizing games. Their brotherly love usually triumphs over problems, and they usually offer Alice some sensible advice on any problems she may have.
The Caterpillar (performed by Wesley Mann) is a large caterpillar and Wonderland's wisest resident. When the Caterpillar speaks, he draws out his vowels in a long, deep voice. As a bug, he has three pairs of hands, which he often uses in tandem to complete tasks. The Caterpillar has a book of wondrous stories, similar to fables in their animal characters and simple morals. The characters often visit the Caterpillar in his mushroom glen to seek advice, which comes in the form of a story. Occasionally, he leaves his patch to visit other Wonderland areas. The Caterpillar's stories were animated by Will Vinton Productions.
The Cheshire Cat (performed by Richard Kuhlman) is a purple-striped cat. He has the power to disappear and reappear at will. The Cat loves to play all manner of practical jokes on the Wonderlanders, but even he occasionally performs some act of kindness.
The Dormouse (performed by John Lovelady) is a tiny rodent. The Dormouse lives in a teapot on the Hatter's tea table. Despite his small size, he apparently has all the necessities of life inside his home, including a kitchen sink and a painting gallery.

Supporting
The Duchess (portrayed by Teri Garr) is the Red Queen's chief rival and, in a strange way, good friend. The Duchess and the Queen constantly quest to upstage each other, often trading insults along the way. Often refers to the Queen as "Twinkle Toes". Apparently, their rivalry began when they were still quite young. All of the Wonderlanders assume that the Queen and Duchess dislike each other, but deep down, the two admit that they have a special, if rocky, relationship.
The Walrus (portrayed by Ken Page) is a newcomer to Wonderland. When the Walrus first moved to Wonderland, he was the victim of prejudice, but soon gained friendships with all of the other citizens. The Walrus is quite smart-although he does have one rather strange oddity, in that his best friend Pinniped (credited as himself) is completely invisible. Though the Walrus seems different, he is accepted as just another member of the Wonderland gang.
Although not really a living breathing character, Crystalvision (Crystal for short) is often seen around Wonderland in various places. Crystal's role in Wonderland is something like that of a television showing clips and prerecorded images for all the citizens of Wonderland to see. In some episodes, it was shown having a real personality by making joke via showing words on its screen and by the characters acknowledging it as a person.

Episodes

Season 1

Season 2
{{Episode table |background=#FF5C7D |overall= |title= |airdate= |episodes=
{{Episode list
|EpisodeNumber=41
|Title=Noses Off
|OriginalAirDate=
|ShortSummary=While trying to help Her Majesty come up with an original costume for an upcoming masquerade ball, the Hatter and Hare accidentally attach a ridiculous rubber nose to the Queen's face, then can't get it off. The Queen scrambles to get out of her predicament before that afternoon's photo session with "Palace Beautiful" magazine.

Note: This episode was released on the "Missing Ring Mystery" VHS. Richard Kuhlman, the voice of The Cheshire Cat, is seen on screen as the reporter, Dirk Deadline.<ref>Disney's Adventures in Wonderland VHS "The Missing Ring Mystery" Copyright 1993</ref> This episode also marks a permanent outfit change for Tweedles.
|LineColor=FF5C7D
}}

}}

Season 3

Home media
Buena Vista Home Video released three volumes of certain episodes on VHS in 1993.

Streaming
The series was made available for streaming on Disney+ on April 30, 2021.

Awards
Daytime Emmy Awards
1992 – Outstanding Hairstyling – Richard Sabre and Tish Simpson (Won)
1994 – Outstanding Makeup – Ron Wild and Karen Stephens (Won) 
1994 – Outstanding Writing in a Children's Series – Daryl Busby and Tom J. Astle (Won) (Tied with Sesame Street) 
1995 – Outstanding Costume Design – Lois DeArmond (Won)
1996 – Outstanding Makeup – Karen Stephens and Ron Wild (Won)
1996 – Outstanding Directing in a Children's Series'' – Shelley Jensen, David Grossman and Gary Halvorson (Won)

References

External links

Adventures in Wonderland at TVShowsOnDVD.com

1990s American children's television series
1990s American music television series
1992 American television series debuts
1995 American television series endings
Television shows based on Alice in Wonderland
Disney Channel original programming
Television series by Disney
English-language television shows
American television shows featuring puppetry
Alice in Wonderland (franchise)
American children's adventure television series
American children's education television series
American children's fantasy television series
American children's musical television series
Television series about children